Brahim Konaté (born 20 March 1996) is a French footballer who plays as a midfielder for lithuanian club FK Kauno Žalgiris.

Club career
An AJ Auxerre youth graduate, Konaté played for two seasons as a senior with the reserves before making his first team debut on 18 September 2015, starting in a 1–0 Ligue 2 home win over Chamois Niortais.

Konaté scored his first professional goal on 6 November 2015, but in a 1–2 home loss against RC Lens. In 2018, he moved to fellow second division side Niort.

On 31 August 2021, free agent Konaté moved abroad and signed a one-year contract with Spanish Segunda División side CF Fuenlabrada.

FK Kauno Žalgiris 
On 14 February 2023 was announced that player signed with lithuanian club Kauno Žalgiris.

International career
Konaté was born in France and is of Malian descent. He is a youth international with the France U20s.

References

External links

 

Living people
1996 births
People from Montfermeil
French people of Malian descent
Association football midfielders
French footballers
France youth international footballers
Ligue 2 players
AJ Auxerre players
Chamois Niortais F.C. players
CF Fuenlabrada footballers
Footballers from Seine-Saint-Denis
French expatriate footballers
French expatriate sportspeople in Spain
Expatriate footballers in Spain